Tavolara may refer to:

Places
 Tavolara island, an island off the coast of Sardinia, once an independent kingdom
Kingdom of Tavolara
 Tavolara, a fictional town and island in the Philippines ruled by a cannibal king, in the 1902 comic opera "Queen Philippine," produced by the Pi Eta theatrical society at Harvard University

People
 Eugenio Tavolara (1901-1963), Sardinian artist

Ships
 Tavolara, an Italian steamship, sunk in June 1916 along with the Rondino and five smaller vessels, the Francesco Fadre, the Era, the Antonla V, the Annetta, and the Adelia
 Tavolara, an Italian tugboat in use 1916-1943
 Tavolara, an Italian tugboat in use 1956-1976
 Tavolara, a ship in the modern Italian navy

Other
 Società Sportiva Tavolara Calcio, an Italian football club
 Tavolara, a racehorse, fl. 1913-1915